Bharati Mukherjee (July 27, 1940 – January 28, 2017) was an Indian American-Canadian writer and professor emerita in the department of English at the University of California, Berkeley. She was the author of a number of novels and short story collections, as well as works of nonfiction.

Early life and education
Of Indian Hindu Bengali Brahmin origin, Mukherjee was born in present-day Kolkata, West Bengal, India during British rule. She later travelled with her parents to Europe after Independence, only returning to Calcutta in the early 1950s.  There she attended the Loreto School. She received her B.A. from the University of Calcutta in 1959 as a student of Loreto College, and subsequently earned her M.A. from Maharaja Sayajirao University of Baroda in 1961. She next travelled to the United States to study at the University of Iowa.  She received her M.F.A. from the Iowa Writers' Workshop in 1963 and her PhD in 1969 from the department of Comparative Literature.

Career

After more than a decade living in Montreal and Toronto in Canada, Mukherjee and her husband, Clark Blaise returned to the United States. She wrote of the decision in "An Invisible Woman," published in a 1981 issue of Saturday Night. Mukherjee and Blaise co-authored  Days and Nights in Calcutta (1977). They also wrote the 1987 work, The Sorrow and the Terror: The Haunting Legacy of the Air India Tragedy (Air India Flight 182).

In addition to writing many works of fiction and non-fiction, Mukherjee taught at McGill University, Skidmore College, Queens College, and City University of New York before joining the faculty at UC Berkeley.

In 1988 Mukherjee won the National Book Critics Circle Award- for her collection The Middleman and Other Stories. In a 1989 interview with Ameena Meer, Mukherjee stated that she considered herself an American writer, and not an Indian expatriate writer.

Mukherjee died due to complications of rheumatoid arthritis and takotsubo cardiomyopathy on January 28, 2017, in Manhattan at the age of 76. She was survived by her husband and son. Her other son, Bart, predeceased her in 2015.

Works

Novels
The Tiger's Daughter (1971)
Wife (1975)
Jasmine (1989)
The Holder of the World (1993)
Leave It to Me (1997)
Desirable Daughters (2002)
The Tree Bride (2004)
Miss New India (2011)

Short story collections
Darkness (1985)
The Middleman and Other Stories  (1988)
A Father
The Management of Grief

Memoir
Days and Nights in Calcutta (1977, with Clark Blaise)

Non-fiction
The Sorrow and the Terror: The Haunting Legacy of the Air India Tragedy (1987, with Clark Blaise)
 Political Culture and Leadership in India (1991)
 Regionalism in Indian Perspective (1992)

Awards and honors
 1988: National Book Critics Circle Award (The Middleman and Other Stories).
 Mukherjee was awarded an honorary Doctor of Humane Letters (L.H.D.) from Whittier College in 2013.

Related novels 
 The Tortilla Curtain– T.C.Boyle

References

Further reading
Abcarian, Richard and Marvin Klotz. "Bharati Mukherjee." In Literature: The Human Experience, 9th edition. New York: Bedford/St. Martin's, 2006: 1581–1582.
Alter, Stephen and Wimal Dissanayake (ed.). "Nostalgia by Bharati Mukherjee." The Penguin Book of Modern Indian Short Stories. New Delhi, Middlesex, New York: Penguin Books, 1991: 28–40.
Kerns-Rustomji, Roshni. "Bharati Mukherjee." In The Heath Anthology of American Literature, 5th edition, Vol. E. Paul Lauter and Richard Yarborough (eds.). New York: Houghton Mifflin Co., 2006: 2693–2694.
Majithia, Sheetal. "Of Foreigners and Fetishes: A Reading of Recent South Asian American Fiction", Samar 14: The South Asian American Generation (Fall/Winter 2001): 52–53. 
New, W. H., ed. "Bharati Mukerjee." In Encyclopedia of Literature in Canada. Toronto: University of Toronto Press, 2002: 763–764.
Selvadurai, Shyam (ed.). "Bharati Mukherjee: The Management of Grief." Story-Wallah: A Celebration of South Asian Fiction. New York: Houghton Mifflin, 2005: 91–108.

External links

 India: In Word and Image
 Bharati Mukherjee entry in The Canadian Encyclopedia

Interviews
 Beatrice Interview 1997
 A conversation with Bharati Mukherjee (February 2003)
 Global India Newswire interview (January 2012)
 Meer, Ameena: Bharati Mukherjee. (Fall 1989)

Misc.
BBC World Service
A Declaration of Independence
Further links

1940 births
2017 deaths
American Hindus
20th-century American novelists
21st-century American novelists
20th-century Canadian novelists
21st-century Canadian novelists
Indian emigrants to the United States
Bengali writers
Writers from California
Canadian women novelists
University of California, Berkeley faculty
American novelists of Indian descent
American women novelists
American women writers of Indian descent
American people of Bengali descent
Loreto College, Kolkata alumni
University of Calcutta alumni
Maharaja Sayajirao University of Baroda alumni
American women short story writers
Iowa Writers' Workshop alumni
Iowa Writers' Workshop faculty
Indian postmodern writers
Bengali Hindus
Canadian women short story writers
American short story writers of Asian descent
American writers of Indian descent
20th-century Canadian women writers
21st-century Canadian women writers
20th-century Canadian short story writers
21st-century Canadian short story writers
American academics of Indian descent
20th-century American short story writers
21st-century American short story writers
21st-century Indian women writers
20th-century Indian women writers
Writers from Kolkata
20th-century Indian novelists
21st-century Indian novelists
Women writers from West Bengal
Novelists from West Bengal
Novelists from Iowa
20th-century American women writers
21st-century American women writers
Deaths from cardiomyopathy
Deaths from arthritis
Indian scholars